Ben Zhairi (born 17 May 1992) is an Israeli footballer who plays as a left back for Hapoel Umm al-Fahm.

Honours

Club
Bnei Yehuda
Israel State Cup (1): 2016–17

External links 

1992 births
Israeli Jews
Living people
Israeli footballers
Footballers from Central District (Israel)
Bnei Yehuda Tel Aviv F.C. players
Hapoel Kfar Saba F.C. players
Hapoel Petah Tikva F.C. players
Maccabi Netanya F.C. players
Hapoel Ashkelon F.C. players
Hapoel Umm al-Fahm F.C. players
Israeli Premier League players
Liga Leumit players
People from Magshimim
Israeli people of Yemeni-Jewish descent
Association football defenders